Vicky "D" was a short-lived New York City-based post-disco/garage house group best known for their club hit "This Beat Is Mine". Released in late 1981, the song peaked at number 11 on the Billboard Club Play Singles chart in February 1982, and peaked at number 42 on the UK Singles Chart in March 1982.

"This Beat Is Mine" was distributed by Sam Records in the US and Virgin Records in the UK.

History

Background
Vicky "D" recorded two songs for Sam Records; uptempo dance hit "This Beat Is Mine" and uncharted reggae song "Mystery Lover", respectively.
"This Beat Is Mine" was produced by Gary R. Turnier of Gary's Gang.

Legacy
Vicky D's recordings can be found on various compilation albums such as 80s Groove, Vol. II (Ministry of Sound), 100 Hits: 80s Dance (Demon Music Group) and Boogie's Gonna Getcha: '80s New York Boogie (BackBeat).

Snoop Dogg sampled "This Beat Is Mine" for a song on his 2011 Doggumentary album, called "This Weed Iz Mine".

Chart performance

Discography

Singles
"This Beat Is Mine"

References

American dance music groups
Electronic music groups from New York (state)
American garage house musicians
American house musicians
American boogie musicians
Musical groups established in 1981
Musical groups disestablished in 1982
Musical groups from New York City
SAM Records artists
Virgin Records artists